15th Politburo may refer to:
 15th Politburo of the Chinese Communist Party
 Politburo of the 15th Congress of the All-Union Communist Party (Bolsheviks)
 15th Politburo of the Communist Party of Czechoslovakia